The term E mark has more than one meaning

  Type approval mark for the automotive industry
 ℮, the Estimated sign

See also
 CE mark, a statement of conformity to EU standards
 E. Mark Gold, an American physicist, mathematician and computer scientist
 E. Mark Stern, an American psychologist